Kemah Bob is an American comedian from Waco, Texas. She is best known for hosting It's a Sin: After Hours, and co-hosting The Island with Tom Allen and Jason Forbes.

Early and personal life
Bob grew up in Houston, Texas, and went to school in Waco, Texas. She has lived in California and London. Bob's grandfather is Camille Bob. 

Bob uses she/they pronouns. In an interview with Metro, Bob said "I do identify as a woman, I use she/they pronouns, but there are so many unanswered questions that I don’t feel the need to answer around my own gender identity". Bob is pansexual and queer. She has been vocal about her experiences of racism, telling Dave's Just Jokes in 2022 that "there are a lot of places where I don't want to go, won't go, am fortunate to not have to go, okay, and I feel like back to Texas is one of them".

Bob has bipolar disorder, which she was diagnosed with the week of her twentieth birthday after a friend called her mother to complain that the speed of her speech had increased to the point of incomprehensibility. Her mother responded to this by driving four hours from Houston to Waco to perform a wellness check, only for Bob to swear and shout at her, which prompted her to take Bob to the emergency room.

Career
Bob started her comedy career in Los Angeles. She told Dave's Just Jokes in 2022 that she got into comedy after a theatre professor pulled her aside after a class and pointed out how talkative she was in class, but that he enjoyed some of her comments, and suggested that she audition for an improv team. She has cited The Inbetweeners and Skins as her inspiration to move to the UK.

Bob hosts a comedy night and podcast called FOC It Up, featuring comedians of colour who aren't cisgender men. In 2019 she was a finalist in the Funny Women awards. She maintains a drag king persona, Lil' Test Ease, intended as a conservative men's rights activist.

In 2021, she presented It's a Sin: After Hours. Later that year, she worked on the Comedy Central panel show Yesterday, Today and The Day Before, but quit after the first episode 'in solidarity' with fellow comedian Sophie Duker over cuts to Duker's monologue about the conflict between Israel and Palestine. She co-hosted The Island with Tom Allen and Jason Forbes the following year. She also appeared on two weeks of Richard Osman's House of Games, both times attracting attention for her voice; she has also appeared on Don't Hate the Playaz, Elephant in the Room, Guessable, CelebAbility, Apocalypse Wow, Sorry, I Didn't Know, and Question Team, the latter with a cameo from Lil' Test Ease, as whom she appeared as on Celebrity Karaoke Club: Drag Edition.

Awards and nominations

Notes

References

External links
 
 
 

African-American stand-up comedians
African-American female comedians
Entertainers from Houston
American expatriates in England
Living people
Comedians from London
Queer women
American LGBT comedians

Year of birth missing (living people)